Malangali can refer to:

 Malangali, Mufindi, an administrative ward in Mufindi District, Iringa Region, Tanzania
 Malangali, Sumbawanga, a ward (borough) in the city of Sumbawanga, Tanzania
 Malangali, Ileje, an administrative ward in Ileje District, Mbeya Region, Tanzania